Maximilian "Max" Goof is an animated character who is the son of the Disney character Goofy. He first appeared in the 1951 short "Fathers Are People" as Goofy Jr., and later appeared in the 1992 television series Goof Troop as Max Goof, a preteen. He then later appeared as a teenager in the spin-off film A Goofy Movie (1995), its direct-to-video sequel An Extremely Goofy Movie (2000), and in the 2001 TV series House of Mouse as a parking valet. He appeared as a child in the direct-to-video film Mickey's Once Upon a Christmas (1999) and as a young adult in its sequel Mickey's Twice Upon a Christmas (2004).

Max has also appeared as a playable character in video games such as Goof Troop (1993) for the Super NES, Disney Golf (2002) for the PlayStation 2, and Disney's Extremely Goofy Skateboarding (2001) for PC CD.

Origins
The first appearance of Goofy's son was in the 1951 theatrical short Fathers Are People. He is referred to as Goofy Junior or simply Junior. He later appeared in a few other shorts such as Father's Lion (1952), Father's Day Off (in which Goofy refers to his son as "George" at one point), Father's Weekend (1953), and Aquamania (1961). In these earlier films, Goofy was also portrayed with a wife, though nameless and with her face always hidden from view. When Goof Troop was created, Goofy Junior evolved into Max, and Goofy's wife was no longer on the scene. Disney Guest Services FAQ later stated there is no definitive answer regarding details of his mother, as one has not been revealed "on the screen".

Overview

Max is one of the few Disney characters, aside from his best friend PJ and Huey, Dewey, and Louie, child or otherwise, who has actually aged in subsequent appearances. He is depicted as an 11-year-old in Goof Troop, then a teenager in high school in A Goofy Movie, and then in An Extremely Goofy Movie he is a high school graduate starting college. In House of Mouse, he is still a teenager but one who is old enough to be employed as a parking valet. In Mickey's Once Upon a Christmas, he is a child who looks and sounds younger than he does in Goof Troop. In Mickey's Twice Upon a Christmas, he is a young adult who is returning home for the holidays.

Max, much to his own dismay, takes after his father at times, whether it be mannerisms (including Goofy's trademark laugh) or occasionally being clumsy (although that is a trait he does not display obviously in An Extremely Goofy Movie during the College X-Games competition). He feels that he is much cooler than Goofy however, and is not as earnest and humble as his old man, as he can be somewhat of a show-off at times when he excels at anything. While Goofy is still clumsy, he works hard to be a good father towards Max, at one time reprimanding him to take personal responsibility by telling him about his (Max's) great-uncle, Eliot Goof, an FBI agent with a never-give-up attitude (and a parody of Eliot Ness). In the Goof Troop show, there are times he would get suckered in by Pete and his get-rich-quick schemes, only to come around towards the end. It seems, personality wise, that PJ is more like Goofy at times, while Max seems more like Pete. Despite everything, Max loves his father, even if he does wish that Goofy would be a little more normal.

In the Goof Troop television series, Max is voiced by Dana Hill, while Shaun Fleming voices the younger Max in Mickey's Once Upon a Christmas. Jason Marsden voices an older Max in all other appearances starting with A Goofy Movie. The Goof Troop series shows some of his relatives – an older cousin named Debbie was featured in the episode "Leader of the Pack". In the Halloween episode "Hallow-Weenies" his father's "great-great-granddaddy" was Gooferamus T. Goofy, while a  "Gooferamus G. Goof" is instead referred in "Calling All Goofs" as Max's "great-great-great-grandpappy"; at a family reunion in "Calling All Goofs" his relatives are Goofy's Aunt Goophelia, Pattonleather Goof (Goofy's great-uncle and a parody of General George S. Patton), Wernher von Goof (Goofy's scientist cousin and a parody of Wernher von Braun), and M. Angelo Goof (Goofy's artist uncle and a parody of Michelangelo). In "the Old Country" his father's "great-grand uncle" was the late mad scientist Dr. Frankengoof. Other relatives include Sir Goofy of Knock-Knees A.K.A. "Goofin' Hood" (Max's great-great-great-great-great-great-great-great-great-great-granddad, and a parody of Robin Hood), Sherlock Goof (Max's great-great-great uncle and a parody of Sherlock Holmes), Mopalong Goofy (Max's great-great-great-grandpa and a parody of Hopalong Cassidy), and Caveman Goof (Max's and Goofy's prehistoric ancestor). In one episode of Goof Troop, Goofy says that Max was scared of the witch in Snow White and the Seven Dwarfs when he was younger.

Over the course of his life, Max's  has been romantically involved with at least two young ladies. In A Goofy Movie, Max tries to impress a popular girl at his school named Roxanne, and ends up with her by the film's end, but by the second movie, Max is apparently single again as he flirts with a number of other girls at the college. However, in an episode of House of Mouse, he and Roxanne are a couple once more, on a date at the titular House of Mouse. Later, in Mickey's Twice Upon a Christmas, Max is seen with yet another a girl named Mona, whom he brings home for Christmas to meet his father and attempts to impress her while trying not to be embarrassed by his father's goofiness. Both Roxanne and Mona are voiced by Kellie Martin, except in the House of Mouse episode in which Roxanne is instead voiced by Grey DeLisle.

Max has a love for skateboarding, as shown in the Goof Troop episodes "Leader of the Pack" and "Meanwhile, Back at the Ramp" and the films A Goofy Movie and An Extremely Goofy Movie.

Appearances

Goof Troop
In the series Goof Troop, Max is the son of Goofy Goof and Mrs. Goof, who was born in Spoonerville, Spoonville County, Ohio, in 1981, whereby in 1992 he is 11 years old. He is active, nice, observant, friendly, and best friends with P.J., Pete's son. He and P.J. are in the same grade at their junior high school. He loves his father, and is close to him, but wishes he would be a bit more normal. He wears purple baggy jeans, white gloves, yellow and green sneakers, and a redshirt.

A Goofy Movie

A Goofy Movie in 1995 features Max as a 14-year-old high school student, finishing the school year before going on summer vacation. In this movie, Max has grown to find his father's goofy antics embarrassing, and is likewise viewed by his peers as a geek and a goof himself; a view he seeks to change at the school assembly when he dresses up like the musician rock star Powerline and interrupts the principal's speech to dance and perform to Powerline's hit song "Stand Out" before the entire student body. Additionally, Max seeks to gain the attention of his crush, a popular girl named Roxanne, whom Max is convinced only ever looks right through him and believes the laugh he inherited from his father ("ah-hyuck") is to her disliking. Though Max ends up in detention for hijacking the assembly, he succeeds in not only impressing the other students but also winning the affections of Roxanne, who shyly yet delightedly agrees to go with him to a party that is to be held the next Saturday.

However, the principal informs Max's father, Goofy, about Max's bad behavior. Fearful that his son is becoming a delinquent, Goofy decides to take Max on a cross-country fishing trip for some 'father-son bonding', much to Max's chagrin. Before Goofy and Max hit the road, Max pays a quick visit to Roxanne's house to explain to her why he can no longer go with her to the party but ends up lying to her that it is because he is instead going to see Powerline live in concert in Los Angeles and that he and his father will join Powerline on stage for the last song since, as Max claims, Goofy and Powerline are an old acquaintance. The guilt from this lie eats at Max throughout the film, while Goofy tries to bond with his son in ways that end up pushing Max away even further. When Goofy appoints Max the official navigator of their road trip, things go much more smoothly for the two as Max gets to pick all the stops along the way.

But, unbeknownst to Goofy, Max had secretly changed the driving route on the map to lead them to Los Angeles, and when Goofy finds out, he and Max come to a head as the two finally let out all their held-back emotions at each other before they finally reach an understanding in which Max confesses to his dad how he has felt about Roxanne and the lie he told her before while Goofy explains that he just wants to be a part of Max's life and that even though he's all grown up, he is still Goofy's son. By this point, Max and Goofy admit that they are stuck together and would not want to be with anyone else in this situation. The two actually make it to the Powerline concert, even appearing (accidentally) onstage. By the end of the film, when the two arrive back home, Max reveals to Roxanne that he lied, admitting that he just wanted her to like him. Roxanne in turn confesses that she already did like Max, revealing that the goofy laugh Max had been so embarrassed by was the very thing that led to her liking him. After Goofy's car suddenly explodes due to the damage after it had fallen down the waterfall, he is sent crashing through the roof of Roxanne's porch, at which point Max introduces Roxanne to his dad.

An Extremely Goofy Movie

In the direct-to-video sequel to A Goofy Movie, An Extremely Goofy Movie in 2000, Max is a 19-year-old high school graduate and leaves for college with his best friends P.J. and Bobby Zimuruski. He hopes to start a new life for himself and partake in the College X-Games competition and eventually graduate at 23, in 2004. Upon his arrival to the campus, he and his friends are met by the five-time X-Games champions, the Gamma Mu Mu fraternity. However, because the Gammas invited only Max and not P.J. and Bobby to join them, Max makes a bet against the Gammas' leader, Bradley Uppercrust III, to see who will be towel boy to the other should either win the X-Games.

Meanwhile, Goofy gets fired from his job (for an accident caused by his empty nest syndrome) and must go back to college to get a degree, as it is the only way for him to get a new job. He attends the same college as his son, much to Max's dismay as he had hoped to finally get away from his father's overbearing doting. Eventually, Max manages to distract his father by introducing him to Ms. Sylvia Marpole, the college's librarian, who takes a romantic interest in Goofy and vice versa while Max sneaks off to practice his skateboarding. When Goofy gets a date with Sylvia, he rushes off to tell Max only to interfere with Max's practice, resulting in the onlooking Bradley to misinterpret Goofy's clumsy antics on Max's skateboard for skill and offers Goofy membership to the Gammas. Max encourages his father to join, viewing it as another distraction to keep Goofy further away from his X-Games practices.

When Goofy inadvertently beats Max at the qualifying rounds for the College X-Games (thanks in part to some sneaky cheating by Bradley), Max ends up blowing up at his father, revealing his desires to get away from his father and estranges him completely by telling him to "leave him alone and get his own life", sending Goofy into depression. When Goofy later overhears the Gammas' plan to cheat in the games, Goofy tries to warn his son, who does not believe him, as he still wants him out of his life. But once it becomes clear to Max (during the X-Games' final round) that the Gammas really have been cheating all along, Max realizes that Goofy was telling the truth and, feeling remorseful for disowning him and not listening to his warnings, redeems himself by managing to ask his dad to fill in for the incapacitated P.J., which Goofy quickly accepts. During the final stretch of the triathlon, Bradley activates a rocket hidden in Max's skateboard, causing an explosion that ends up trapping fellow Gamma member Tank underneath some fallen fiery debris. Max forgoes heading straight to the finish line to first rescue Tank (with help from Goofy) and ultimately manages to just barely beat Bradley to the finish line. In the end, Goofy graduates a year later in 2001, where Max is now 20, and both father and son make amends at Goofy's graduation and Max gives his father the X-Games championship trophy as an apology gift for his unkind and selfish disownment while Goofy finally sees that Max no longer needs a guardian as the two-part ways following their now-restored relationship, with Goofy (now cured of his empty nest syndrome) heading to another date with Sylvia, and finally leaving Max to at last live his own life at college.

Disney's House of Mouse
In the House of Mouse TV series, Max is still a teenager (although considerably older than in A Goofy Movie) and works as the parking valet for the club, and appears to be most level-headed and calm of all the club's employees. However, this may be because his duties are not nearly as important as some of the others, and his inclusions are just to help out the rest of the cast. Yet, in episodes that revolve around him or Goofy, his insecurities and personal flaws are much more noticeable and intentional.

In the episode "Max's Embarrassing Date", Max is off work and on a date with Roxanne at the House of Mouse. While all the main Disney cast (Mickey, Minnie, Donald and Daisy) attempted to keep Goofy away from the two so as to not embarrass Max in front of Roxanne, they ended up embarrassing him themselves until Goofy finally cuts in to give Max and Roxanne some privacy for the night. Max makes a cameo appearance in Mickey's House of Villains when the villains are entering the House of Mouse.

Mickey's Once Upon a Christmas and Mickey's Twice Upon a Christmas
In the direct-to-video traditionally animated film Mickey's Once Upon a Christmas, in the segment "A Very Goofy Christmas", Max goes bicycling into the mall with his father, Goofy, to catch up to the mail truck in order to mail his letter to Santa. However, when their neighbor Pete tells Max that there is no such thing as Santa, Goofy goes out of his way to try to prove to Max that Santa does exist. However, after staying up all night with no luck, Goofy is filled with disappointment, leaving it to Max to cheer his father. In the end, Santa finally arrives to the joyful awe and wonderment of Goofy and Max. In this film, Max is a little boy, placing "A Very Goofy Christmas" chronologically before all other titles Max appears in.

The direct-to-video computer animated film Mickey's Twice Upon a Christmas (a sequel to Mickey's Once Upon a Christmas) is currently Max's latest appearance in any Disney media produced. In the segment titled "Christmas Maximus", Max has grown up into a young adult. He brings his lady friend Mona (whom Max hopes to make his girlfriend) home for Christmas to meet his father. Goofy picks them up at the train station and brings them back to the house, where Goofy shows Mona Max's baby pictures and unwittingly embarrasses Max with all his fatherly love. In the end, as Mona finds Goofy's quirks to be endearing, Max decides to forget his embarrassment and join in the fun.

Max later appears (in a non-speaking role) with his father and the other characters in the last segment of the film, "Mickey's Dog-Gone Christmas", in which they drive around the city in a snowplow to look for Pluto, who had previously run away after his having angering Mickey. After Pluto returns, everyone (Max included) pulls up to Mickey's house in the snowplow, exits the snowplow, and goes inside the house to celebrate Christmas. Max and everyone applaud Mickey and Pluto topping the Christmas tree with the star decoration, and then they all join in singing a short medley of "We Wish You a Merry Christmas" and "Deck the Halls" to close out the special.

During the end credits sequence, a pop-up book version of Max and Mona are seen sliding close to each other (presumably to share a kiss) before a pop-up version of Goofy covers them both from view with a picture frame containing credits specific to the "Christmas Maximus" segment. Later, the closing image of Goofy and Max holding a Christmas caroling book together from the end of "Mickey's Dog-Gone Christmas" is shown again towards the end of the credits, as the last time Max was seen in Disney animation for the next sixteen years.

DuckTales
In the 2017 DuckTales series, Goofy refers to "Maxie" by name in the episode "Quack Pack!", when the former shows pictures of him and Max in his wallet, with one showing Max and P.J. and another with Max and Roxanne.

Chip 'n Dale: Rescue Rangers
In the film, he makes a cameo appearance in his original Goof Troop look during the credits scene.

Disney Parks
At the Walt Disney World Resort, Max is a meetable character, and is featured during the "Move It! Shake It! Mousekedance It!" parade. He and Goofy were also part of the "Mickeys Magical TV World" show in the Magic Kingdom.

At Tokyo Disneyland, Max occasionally appears with Goofy on floats in seasonal parades. He can also be found sometimes as a meetable character at the front of the park.

Voice actors

Bobby Driscoll voiced Goofy Junior from 1951 to 1952.

In 1992, when Goof Troop was created, Goofy Junior evolved to Max Goof as a preteen.  Max was voiced by Dana Hill; Hill would continued to voice Max for commercials, Disney projects, promos, Disney parks and other miscellaneous material with the exception of A Goofy Movie until her death in 1996.

In 1995, Max Goof became a teenager in A Goofy Movie where he is voiced by Jason Marsden, which became his first animated film that he worked on at the age of 20; Marsden continued to voice Max in An Extremely Goofy Movie, House of Mouse, Mickey's Twice Upon a Christmas and other Disney projects.

References

External links

 Max Goof on IMDb

Disney core universe characters
Television characters introduced in 1992
Film characters introduced in 1951
Anthropomorphic dogs
Fictional skateboarders
Male characters in animation
Child characters in television
Goof Troop
Teenage characters in television